"Afreen Afreen" is a ghazal song written by Javed Akhtar and composed by Nusrat Fateh Ali Khan. It first featured on their collaborative album Sangam in 1996. In 2016, it was covered by Rahat Fateh Ali Khan (Nusrat's nephew) and Momina Mustehsan during season 9 of Coke Studio.

1996 version
"Afreen Afreen" was first released during the IndiPop and fusion music wave of the mid-1990s as a non-film music video. The music video featured Lisa Ray.

2016 version

It was later rendered by Rahat Fateh Ali Khan with Momina Mustehsan, during season 9 episode 2 of Pakistani musical TV show Coke Studio. The music was directed by Faakhir Mehmood.

Personnel 
Lyricist: Javed Akhtar
 Artists: Rahat Fateh Ali Khan & Momina Mustehsan
 Music director: Faakhir Mehmood
 Produced & directed By: Strings
 Guest musician: Joshua Keith Benjamin (keyboards)
 House band: Imran Akhond (guitars), Aahad Nayani (drums), Kamran 'Mannu' Zafar (bass), Kashan Admani (guitars), Haider Alo (keyboard/piano), Abdul Aziz Kazi (percussions)
 Backing vocalist: Rachel Viccaji, Shahab Hussain, Nimra Rafiq

Popularity 
As of February 2022, it has garnered over 341 million views on YouTube, it is currently third on the list of most viewed YouTube videos of Pakistani-origin, just after Atif Aslam's rendition of "Tajdar-e-Haram" having 342 million views. It was the most-watched Pakistani music video of 2016. According to Google, its lyrics were one of the most searched lyrics for the year 2017. Momina Mustehsan became the fifth-most googled person in Pakistan in 2016.

Version listings

Table of contents

See also 

 Tajdar-e-Haram
 Tera Woh Pyar
 Nusrat Fateh Ali Khan discography
 Rahat Fateh Ali Khan discography
 Coke Studio (Pakistani season 9)

References

 Nusrat Fateh Ali Khan songs
1990s songs
 Rahat Fateh Ali Khan songs
 Songs with lyrics by Javed Akhtar
Coke Studio (Pakistani TV program)
2016 singles
Urdu-language songs
Pakistani songs